Double equal may refer to:
Double-equal operator, part of JavaScript syntax
Double Equals, an album by Raw Radio War